This is a list of mayors of the City of Fall River, Massachusetts, from 1854 to present. Fall River was led by a three-member Board of Selectmen from 1803 until its re-incorporation as a city in 1854.

From 1854 until 1902, mayoral elections were held every year and mayors served one-year terms. In 1902, the mayoral term was increased to two years, which lasted until the city charter was changed in 1965. That year, the mayoral term was again increased, this time to a four-year term. This change would be overturned by voters in 1973 and a two-year term was reinstated.

The mayor's office is located at Fall River Government Center.

Mayoral chronology
, there have been 44 mayors and three acting mayors. Non-consecutive terms by the same person are counted separately (for example, John W. Cummings was both the 14th and 16th mayor). Number of mayors, ranked by party affiliation:

List of Mayors

City managers
Fall River had a city manager from 1929 until 1935.

See also
List of selectmen of Fall River, Massachusetts
History of Fall River, Massachusetts

References

Fall River, Massachusetts